The 1998 U.S. Figure Skating Championships took place on January 4–11, 1998 in Philadelphia, Pennsylvania. Skaters competed in five disciplines across three levels. The disciplines of the competition were men's singles, ladies' singles, pair skating, ice dancing, and compulsory figures. The levels of competition were senior, junior, and novice. Medals were awarded in four colors: gold (first), silver (second), bronze (third), and pewter (fourth).

The event served to help choose the U.S. teams to the 1998 Winter Olympics and the 1998 World Championships. The 1998 World Junior Championships had been held prior to the national championships and so the World Junior Championships team had been chosen at a World Juniors selection competition earlier in the year.

This was the penultimate year of compulsory figures being competed at the U.S. Championships. The novice competitors skated one figure, the juniors and seniors skated three.

Competition notes
 During this competition, Michael Weiss attempted a quadruple lutz jump in his free skating. He put his free foot down on the landing and so the jump was not ratified as complete.
 Despite withdrawing with injury, Jenni Meno / Todd Sand were named to the Olympic Team.
 In the senior ladies event, Amber Corwin, Andrea Gardiner, and Sydne Vogel tied for 7th place in the free skating on Majority Of Placements. Through the Total Ordinary Majority (TOM) tiebreak, Vogel's portion of the tie was broken and she placed 9th in that segment. Corwin and Gardiner's tie was unbreakable and so they shared the placement of 7th in the free skating.
 In the novice pairs event, five teams tied for 8th place in the short program (Tiffany Vise / Ryan Bradley, Erica Christensen / David Gibbons, Krystan McCloy / Jack McCloy, Lindsay Rogeness / Brian Rogeness, Amanda Ross / Michael McPherson). The tie between Vise/Bradley, Christensen/Gibbons and McCloy/McCloy was broken through the Total Ordinary Majority (TOM) tiebreak. The tie between Rogeness/Rogeness and Ross/McPherson was unbreakable and so they shared the placement of 11th in the short program.
 There were several unbreakable ties in the figures competition on the junior and senior levels. Kharen Kloeffler and Brooke Pitman tied for the junior gold, Josselyn Baumgartner and Alecia Moore tied for the junior bronze, Jessica Koslow and Amy Miyoshi tied for seventh place in juniors, Olivia Baer and Sara Stach tied for eleventh place in juniors, and Jaime Clark and Jamie Walzer tied for eighth place in seniors.

Senior results

Men
In his winning free skating, Eldredge attempted but fell on a quad toe loop attempt.

Ladies

Pairs

Ice dancing

Junior results

Men

Ladies

Pairs

Ice dancing

Novice results

Men

Ladies

Pairs

Ice dancing

Figures results

Senior

Junior

Novice

References

External links
 1998 State Farm U.S. Figure Skating Championships
 Event reports

U.S. Figure Skating Championships
United States Figure Skating Championships, 1998
United States Figure Skating Championships, 1998
U.S. Figure Skating Championships
U.S. Figure Skating Championships